Marcellina Emmanuel (born 7 November 1964) is a Tanzanian middle-distance runner. She competed in the women's 1500 metres at the 1980 Summer Olympics.

References

1964 births
Living people
Athletes (track and field) at the 1980 Summer Olympics
Tanzanian female middle-distance runners
Olympic athletes of Tanzania
Place of birth missing (living people)